The 2013–14 All-Ireland Senior Club Football Championship was the 44th staging of the All-Ireland Senior Club Football Championship since its establishment by the Gaelic Athletic Association in 1970-71. The championship began on 20 October 2013 and ended on 17 March 2014.

St. Brigid's entered the championship as the defending champions, however, they were beaten by Castlebar Mitchels in the Connacht Club Championship.

On 17 March 2014, St. Vincent's won the championship following a 4-12 to 2-11 defeat of Castlebar Mitchels in the All-Ireland final at Croke Park. It was their third championship title overall and their first title since 2008.

Tomás Quinn of the St. Vincent's club was the championship's top scorer with 2-33.

Results

Connacht Senior Club Football Championship

Quarter-final

Semi-finals

Final

Leinster Senior Club Football Championship

First round

Quarter-finals

Semi-finals

Final

Munster Senior Club Football Championship

Quarter-finals

Semi-finals

Final

Ulster Senior Club Football Championship

Preliminary round

Quarter-finals

Semi-finals

Final

All-Ireland Senior Club Football Championship

Quarter-final

Semi-finals

Final

Championship statistics

Miscellaneous

Overall

In a single game

References

All-Ireland Senior Club Football Championship
All-Ireland Senior Club Football Championship
All-Ireland Senior Club Football Championship